Daniel Amorim Dias da Silva (born 15 September 1989) is a Brazilian footballer who plays as a forward for Vila Nova, on loan from Tombense.

Club career
Born in Rio de Janeiro, Amorim began his career with Aquidauanense in 2011, scoring 19 goals and being the year's Campeonato Sul-Mato-Grossense top goalscorer. In September of that year, after a short spell at Marília, he signed for Brasiliense,

On 4 July 2012, Amorim signed for Tupi in the Série C. He moved to Tombense in the following year, and subsequently served loan stints at Madureira, Duque de Caxias, Paysandu and Cuiabá.

On 22 August 2018, still owned by Tombense, Amorim was loaned to Série B side Avaí until the end of the year. A backup option during his first year as his club achieved promotion to the Série A, he became a first-choice in the early stages of the 2019 season, reaching 13 goals in 19 matches during the first four months of the year.

Amorim made his first division debut on 5 May 2019, aged 29, starting in a 1–0 away loss against Bahia. He scored his first goal in the category on 19 May, netting a last-minute equalizer in a 1–1 draw at Vasco da Gama, but was subsequently rarely used and suffered an injury in September, ruling him out for the remainder of the season.

Honours
Avaí
Campeonato Catarinense: 2019

References

External links

1989 births
Living people
Footballers from Rio de Janeiro (city)
Brazilian footballers
Association football forwards
Campeonato Brasileiro Série A players
Campeonato Brasileiro Série B players
Campeonato Brasileiro Série C players
Campeonato Brasileiro Série D players
Marília Atlético Clube players
Brasiliense Futebol Clube players
Tupi Football Club players
Tombense Futebol Clube players
Madureira Esporte Clube players
Duque de Caxias Futebol Clube players
Paysandu Sport Club players
Cuiabá Esporte Clube players
Avaí FC players